The Biggest Winner Arab (season 2) is the second season of the Arabic version of the original NBC American reality television series The Biggest Loser. The second season premiered on October 27, 2007.

Contestants 

Teams
 Member of Hani's Team
 Member of Patci's Team
Winners
 250,000 SAR.  Winner (among the finalists)
 50,000 SAR.  Winner (among the eliminated contestants)
* Fahad was eliminated in week 1 but because Fisal quit, Fahad replaced Fisal.

External links

Lebanese television series
2007 Lebanese television seasons
2000s Lebanese television series
Lists of mass media in Lebanon